The 2005 Commonwealth Heads of Government Meeting was the 19th Meeting of the Heads of Government of the Commonwealth of Nations.  It was held in Valletta, Malta, between 25 and 27 November 2005, and hosted by Prime Minister Lawrence Gonzi.

Malta is the smallest country to have hosted a CHOGM, committing the country to a major undertaking.  Nonetheless, the event passed smoothly, marked by the visit of both Queen Elizabeth II, Head of the Commonwealth, and the British aircraft carrier HMS Illustrious.

Commonwealth Ministerial Action Group
The Commonwealth Ministerial Action Group (CMAG) put much emphasis on the position held by Pakistani President Pervez Musharraf, and overcame opposition from Pakistan to declare that his holding the two positions of President and Chief of Army Staff were "incompatible with the basic principles of democracy and the spirit of the Harare Commonwealth principles" and that "until the two offices are separated, the process of democratization will not be irreversible".

Of note to commentators and the media was the non-discussion of Uganda, where opposition leader Kizza Besigye was arrested days before the CHOGM, and two months before the country's first multiparty elections since Yoweri Museveni took power in 1986.  Uganda's capital, Kampala, had been arranged to host the 2007 CHOGM, and the Commonwealth leaders were keenly aware that to hold the CHOGM in a country that was deemed undemocratic would reflect badly on the Commonwealth Secretariat and undermine the Commonwealth's commitment to human rights and good governance.

CMAG membership rotated once again, with Malaysia, Papua New Guinea, Saint Lucia, and the United Kingdom joining it, as the Bahamas, India, Samoa, and Nigeria left.

Footnotes

External links
 Commonwealth Secretariat webpage on CHOGM 2005

2005
2005 conferences
Diplomatic conferences in Malta
21st-century diplomatic conferences (Commonwealth)
2005 in international relations
Malta and the Commonwealth of Nations
21st century in Valletta
November 2005 events in Europe